Eriksen may refer to:

Eriksen (surname)
Eriksen (duo), a Norwegian duo made up of Rita Eriksen and Frank Eriksen

See also
Eriksen flanker task
Stein Eriksen Lodge Botanical Garden